Jorkanden is a 6,473-metre Himalayan peak in the Indian state of Himachal Pradesh. It is the highest peak in the Kinner Kailash range of the Greater Himalayas. An expedition team of the Indo-Tibetan Border Police first climbed the peak on 26 May, 1974. The peak is often confused with the Kinnaur Kailash peak (6,050m), which can be distinguished through its distinctly pointed 'pillar' on top, which is worshipped as a shivling, abode of the Indian god Shiva.

Bibliography

References

Mountains of Himachal Pradesh
Geography of Kinnaur district
Six-thousanders of the Himalayas